Michalis Mytakidis, also known as B.D. Foxmoor (Born on August 21, 1967) is a Greek rapper and hip hop producer. In 1992, he founded Active Member and released the first Greek hip hop album, Diamartyria (Protest), in 1993. In 1995, when Active Member signed to a major label, Warner, and released To megalo kolpo, B.D. Foxmoor started referring to his music as low bap. He has released many solo albums as well as LPs with Active Member and has also produced many releases of other low bap artists.

Discography
I'm Still An Active Member 1994
Sti xasi kai sti feksi 1999
Daneikes Prosefxes 1999
To mystiko oktagono 2001
Afovia 2003
5/2/03 2003
Sfina 2004
Wasted in Hiphopoly 2005
Pyromantic 2006
Otan i mikronooi hiphoragoun 2007
Deep mentals 2007
Darkest light epitome 2008
Madmoana 2009
Vadarkia 2009
Dublaz 44 2011
La Bruja Muerta 2011
GABA2012
Our Stolen Circus 2012
Veterapnos 2015
Armarima 2016
Alivas 2016
Scriptorio 2020

External links 
Low Bap Foundation

Greek rappers
1967 births
Living people
Musicians from Piraeus